Norton City Schools is a school district headquartered in Norton, Ohio.

Schools
 Norton High School
 Norton Middle School
 Norton Elementary School 
 Norton Primary School

Former schools:
 Cornerstone Elementary School
It was demolished by 2017

References

External links
 Norton City Schools

School districts in Ohio
Education in Summit County, Ohio